Q31 may refer to:

 Q31 (New York City bus)
 , a Naïade-class submarine
 IBM AN/FSQ-31 SAC Data Processing System
 London Underground Q31 Stock
 Luqman (sūrah), of the Quran
 Sequoia Field, an airport serving Visalia, California, United States